Nachipatti  is a village panchayat in Vennandur block of Namakkal District in Tamilnadu.

Education
SRI VIDYAA MANDHIR MATRICULATION HIGHER SECONDARY SCHOOL.

References

Villages in Namakkal district
Vennandur block